Shaun Dillon (born 24 August 1984 in Greenock) is a Scottish football coach and former player, who played as a defender. He is currently co-manager of West of Scotland Football League club Kilbirnie Ladeside. He began his career with Kilmarnock in the Scottish Premier League and also played in the Scottish Football League for Greenock Morton, Queen of the South, Stenhousemuir. Stranraer and Stirling Albion.

Playing career
Dillon began his career with Kilmarnock in the Scottish Premier League (SPL). He made an early impact, winning the SPL Young Player of the Month award for December 2002, but disciplinary and weight issues led to him losing his first team place. He stayed with Kilmarnock until 2006, but made only 24 league appearances for the club.

After a loan spell with Greenock Morton, Dillon left Kilmarnock in January 2006 to join Queen of the South. He then played for Stenhousemuir and Stranraer before dropping into junior football in 2008, with Irvine Meadow and then Pollok.

Dillon returned to senior football when he joined Stirling Albion in June 2011. He left Stirling in the 2012 close season, joining junior club Kilbirnie Ladeside. After being transfer-listed by Kilbirnie in August 2013, Dillon joined Arthurlie later that month.

Coaching career
In June 2017, Dillon joined Greenock Juniors as one of two assistants to newly-appointed manager Thomas Molloy. Dillon and Molloy left Greenock in August 2021 to become co-managers of Kilbirnie Ladeside. He left the club in May 2022.

Personal life
Outside of football, Dillon works as an account manager for Hewlett-Packard.

He is a close friend of actor and former Greenock Juniors player Martin Compston; through their relationship, Compston has donated money to the club and began sponsoring Dillon personally in 2020.

References

External links 

1984 births
Living people
Footballers from Greenock
Scottish footballers
Association football defenders
Scottish Premier League players
Scottish Football League players
Kilmarnock F.C. players
Greenock Morton F.C. players
Queen of the South F.C. players
Stenhousemuir F.C. players
Stranraer F.C. players
Scottish Junior Football Association players
Stirling Albion F.C. players
Irvine Meadow XI F.C. players
Pollok F.C. players
Kilbirnie Ladeside F.C. players
Arthurlie F.C. players
Kilbirnie Ladeside F.C. managers
Scottish football managers